Ngozi Ezeocha   (born 12 October 1973) is a Nigerian footballer who played as a defender for the Nigeria women's national football team. She competed with the team at the 1991 FIFA Women's World Cup and 1995 FIFA Women's World Cup.

References

External links
 

1973 births
Living people
Nigerian women's footballers
Nigeria women's international footballers
Place of birth missing (living people)
1995 FIFA Women's World Cup players
Women's association football defenders
1991 FIFA Women's World Cup players
Igbo people